T. J. Jarrett is an American writer and software developer in Nashville, Tennessee.

Works

Books

Poems 
The Children. The Academy of American Poets, 2015. Published in Poem-a-Day.

Anarcha: J Marion Sims Opens My Body for the Thirty-Fourth Time, Summer 2014

Reception of works
Jarret's poetry has been described as "startling", "deft but forceful", and "ambitious".

She has won the Crab Orchard Series in Poetry Open Competition Award, and the Emily Clark Balch Prize for Poetry.

References

External links
Official website

People from Nashville, Tennessee
American women poets
21st-century American poets
Poets from Tennessee
Living people
21st-century American women writers
Year of birth missing (living people)